Eulophia streptopetala is a species of orchid. It can be found from Eritrea to South Africa and also in Yemen. This species is widespread and is usually found at forest margins, in bushy scrub, or in grasslands from the coast to 2550 meters above sea level. The plant produces a tall inflorescence originating from the subterranean pseudobulb that continues to produce flowers over several months. The flowers are approximately one centimetre in diameter with yellow petals and brownish green striped sepals.

References

External links 
 
 

streptopetala